Hengyang Nanyue Airport  is an airport serving the city of Hengyang in Hunan province, China.  Located in Yunji Town, Hengnan County, the airport is named after Mount Heng, also known as Nanyue. It replaced the old Bajialing Airport, which was shut down in 1995.  Construction of the airport started on 7 January 2012 with a total investment of 656 million yuan, and the airport was opened on 23 December 2014, with an inaugural flight from Beijing Nanyuan Airport.

Facilities
It is projected to serve 360,000 passengers annually by 2020.

Airlines and destinations

See also
List of airports in China
List of the busiest airports in China

References

Airports in Hunan
Hengyang
Airports established in 2014
2014 establishments in China